Tippett Canyon, is a valley whose creek drains the northwest watershed of the South Mountains in White Pine County, Nevada.

References 

Valleys of Nevada
Valleys of White Pine County, Nevada